Victoria Williams (born 1958), is an American singer/songwriter and musician.

Victoria Williams may also refer to:

Sportspeople
 Victoria Williams (badminton) (born 1995), badminton player from England
 Victoria Williams (footballer), represented Great Britain at the 2013 Summer Universiade
 Victoria Williams (swimmer), participated in Swimming at the 1988 Summer Paralympics
 Victoria Williams (water polo), represented United States at the 2013 Summer Universiade

Others
 Victoria Williams (actress) (born 1956), British actress
 Victoria Kirstyn Williams, Welsh politician
 Victoria McCloud, UK judge, who practiced law under the maiden name Victoria Williams

See also
 Vicki Williams (born 1956), wrestler